Vice Admiral Anil Kumar Chawla, PVSM, AVSM, NM, VSM, ADC is a retired Indian Navy officer, who served as Flag Officer Commanding-in-Chief Southern Naval Command. He assumed charge on 30 July 2018 succeeding Vice Admiral Abhay Raghunath Karve. He superannuated on 30th November 2021 and was succeeded by Vice Admiral M.A. Hampiholi

Career
Vice Admiral Chawla joined the Navy in 1982 and has commanded , INS Kora, INS Tabar and INS Viraat.

He commanded the Western Fleet from 16 August 2013 to 1 October 2014 before being promoted to Vice Admiral and appointed as the Director General Naval Operations on 31 December 2014. 

He served as Chief of Personnel, Indian Navy from 28 May 2016 to 30 July 2018.

He will superannuate on 30 November 2021.

Military awards and aecorations

References 

Indian Navy admirals
Flag Officers Commanding Western Fleet
Chiefs of Personnel (India)
Recipients of the Param Vishisht Seva Medal
Recipients of the Ati Vishisht Seva Medal
Recipients of the Nau Sena Medal
Recipients of the Vishisht Seva Medal